Mesodica is a genus of moths in the Carposinidae family.

Species
Mesodica aggerata Meyrick, 1910
Mesodica dryas (Diakonoff, 1950) (originally in Meridarchis)
Mesodica infuscata Diakonoff, 1949

References

Natural History Museum Lepidoptera generic names catalog

Carposinidae
Moth genera